The Law of Compensation is 1917 American silent drama film based on a story by Wilson Mizner and directed by Joseph A. Golden. The film starred Norma Talmadge, who played a dual role, Fred Esmelton, and Chester Barnett. It was produced by Joseph Schenck, the husband of its star Talmadge.

Plot
While her husband (Chester Barnett) is out of town, Ruth (Talmadge) is approached by Wells (Edwin Stanley), a small-time song plugger. He claims that he can make a musical comedy star of her if she will come up with some money. But when she tries to ante up the funds, her father (Frederick Esmelton) takes her aside and tells her the story of her mother (also played by Talmadge) who found herself in a similar situation. Her mother ran off with a man, Trevor (John Charles), who later deserted her; after her death, Ruth's father tracked Trevor down and killed him. With all of this in mind, Ruth wisely decides to send Wells on his way.

Cast
 Norma Talmadge as Flora Graham / Ruth Graham
 Fred Esmelton as John Graham (credited as Frederick Esmelton)
 Chester Barnett as Allen Hayes
 John Charles as Frank Trevor
 Sally Crute as Grace Benton
 Fred Hearn as Henry Thurman (credited as Fred G. Hearn)
 Mary Hall as Mrs. Wayne
 Edwin Stanley as Raymond Wells
 Robert W. Cummings as Horace Benton
 Marie Reichardt as Undetermined Role
 Harry Burkhardt as Undetermined Role
 Lorna Volare as Undetermined Role (credited as Baby Lorna)
 Frank Dawson as Undetermined Role

Commentory
While the lives of the mother and daughter interact through their repetition and parallel situations, the story of the mother, while referenced in the first half of the film, is withheld from Flora and the audience until it is told to her in the second half of the film. Although Talmadge is the star with two roles, the men of the film hold all the power and make all the decisions on behalf of the women; the one choice made by a woman, the mother Ruth, has immence consequences for her and her daughter as deviates it from the straight path.

Preservation status
Prints of The Law of Compensation are held at the Library of Congress (incomplete) and the Museum of Modern Art, 35mm.

References

External links
 
 
 Contemporary reviews of the film at the Norma Talmadge website

1917 films
American silent feature films
American black-and-white films
Silent American drama films
1917 drama films
Selznick Pictures films
Films directed by Joseph A. Golden
1910s American films